Pedrick is a surname of British origin. People with that name include:

 Arthur Paul Pedrick (1918–1976), British patent examiner and inventor
 Gale Pedrick (1906–1970), English author, journalist, scriptwriter and broadcaster
 Jean Pedrick (1922–2006), American author, poet, editor and publisher
 Robert John (born Robert John Pedrick, Jr., 1946), American singer-songwriter

See also
 Marcellus Pedrick House AKA Pedrick-Lawson House, located in Ripon, Wisconsin
 USS Stag (AW-1), originally laid down as SS Norman O. Pedrick
 

Surnames of British Isles origin